trans-2-Phenyl-1-cyclohexanol is an organic compound. The two enantiomers of this compound are used in organic chemistry as chiral auxiliaries.

Preparation
The enantioselective synthesis was accomplished by J. K. Whitesell  by adding Pseudomonas fluorescens lipase to racemic trans-2-phenylcyclohexyl chloroacetate. This enzyme is able to hydrolyze the ester bond of the (−)-enantiomer but not the (+)-enantiomer. The (−)-cyclohexanol and the (+)-ester are separated by fractional crystallization and the isolated (+)-ester hydrolyzed to the (+)-cyclohexanol in a separate step.

The enantiomers have also been prepared by the Sharpless asymmetric dihydroxylation of 1-phenylcyclohexene to the diol followed by the selective reduction of the 1-hydroxyl group by Raney nickel.

References 

Secondary alcohols
Phenyl compounds